Melicope hayesii, commonly known as small-leaved doughwood, is a species of shrub or slender tree in the family Rutaceae and is endemic to eastern Australia. It has trifoliate leaves and small white flowers borne in panicles in leaf axils.

Description

Taxonomy
Melicope hayesii was first formally described in 1990 by Thomas Gordon Hartley in the Telopea from specimens collected near Purling Brook, Springbrook. The specific epithet (hayesii) honours Harold C. Hayes, a Forestry Commission botanist.

Distribution and habitat

References

hayesii
Sapindales of Australia
Flora of Queensland
Flora of New South Wales
Plants described in 1990
Taxa named by Thomas Gordon Hartley